The 2009–10 Swiss Cup was the 85th season of Switzerland's annual football cup competition. It began on 17 September with the first game of Round 1 and ended on 9 May 2010 with the Final held at St. Jakob-Park, Basel. The competition was won by FC Basel, who defeated second-level side Lausanne-Sport, 6–0. Since Basel also won the 2009–10 Swiss Super League, Lausanne qualified for the second qualification round of the UEFA Europa League.

Participating clubs
All ten Super League teams and fifteen Challenge League clubs (FC Vaduz are from Liechtenstein and thus play in the 2009–10 Liechtenstein Cup) entered this year's competition, as well as thirteen teams from 1. Liga and 26 teams from lower leagues (their level within the Swiss league pyramid is given in parentheses below). Teams from 1. Liga and below had to qualify through separate qualifying rounds within their leagues.

Round 1
Teams from Super League and Challenge League were seeded in this round. In a match, the home advantage was granted to the team from the lower league, if applicable.

| colspan="3" style="background:#9cc;"|17 September 2009

|-
| colspan="3" style="background:#9cc;"|18 September 2009

|-
| colspan="3" style="background:#9cc;"|19 September 2009

|-
| colspan="3" style="background:#9cc;"|20 September 2009

|}

Round 2
The winners of Round 1 played in this round. Teams from Super League were seeded. In a match, the home advantage was granted to the team from the lower league, if applicable.

| colspan="3" style="background:#9cc;"|17 October 2009

|-
| colspan="3" style="background:#9cc;"|18 October 2009

|-
| colspan="3" style="background:#9cc;"|24 October 2009

|}

Round 3
The winners of Round 2 played in this round. In a match, the home advantage was granted to the team from the lower league, if applicable.

| colspan="3" style="background:#9cc;"|20 November 2009

|-
| colspan="3" style="background:#9cc;"|21 November 2009

|-
| colspan="3" style="background:#9cc;"|22 November 2009

|}

Quarter-finals
The winners of Round 3 played in this round.

Semi-finals
The winners in the quarter-finals played in this round.

Final
The final was played on 9 May 2010 between the two semi-final winners and took place at St. Jakob-Park in Basel.

External links
 Official site

References

Swiss Cup seasons
Swiss Cup
Swiss Cup